Arun Phadke is a University Distinguished Research Professor in the Department of Electrical and Computer Engineering at Virginia Tech. Along with fellow Virginia Tech professor James Thorp, Dr. Phadke received The Franklin Institute's 2008 Benjamin Franklin Medal in Electrical Engineering  for their contributions to the power industry, particularly microprocessor controllers and Phasor measurement unit (PMU) technology in electric power systems.

Biography
Phadke received his Bachelor of Science degree from Agra University in 1955. He received the B. Tech. (Honors) degree from the Indian Institute of Technology Kharagpur in 1959. He then joined the Illinois Institute of Technology in Chicago where he received the Master of Science degree in 1961.  He joined the University of Wisconsin in Madison for his Ph.D. in Electrical Engineering (1964).  He joined the University of Wisconsin as a faculty member after graduation, and later started  working in Allis-Chalmers company in Milwaukee, where he worked on developing software for HVDC and HVAC system analysis.  In 1969 he joined American Electric Power Service Corporation in New York city in their Computer Applications Department.  Here he led a team of researchers to develop digital computer based relaying systems. Dr. Phadke's work on Distance Relaying using the Discrete Fourier Transformer is the basis of most commercial computer based relays now in existence.

Dr. Phadke remained active in education of practicing engineers.  He taught various courses at the summer institute in University of Wisconsin - Madison for more than 50 years.

Dr. Phadke became a Professor at Virginia Tech in 1982, where he founded the Power Engineering Center. He was the first American Electric Power Chair holder at Virginia Tech, and later was appointed a University Distinguished Professor. He retired from active teaching in Virginia Tech in 2003, and was appointed a University Distinguished Research Professor, a position he holds at present.

Dr. Phadke and his team invented the Phasor Measurement Unit (PMU) at Virginia Tech, a technology which is now in use by almost all electric utility companies around the world.

He is also an accomplished artist. See, e.g., his pencil drawing of Venus_de_Milo, done while teaching at the University of Wisconsin. .

Awards and Recognition

 1980: IEEE Fellow, for "contributions to the application of digital computers to power systems."
1986: Power Engineering Educator Award of the Edison Electric Institute.
1991: IEEE Power Engineering Society Outstanding Power Engineering Educator Award.
1991: Centennial Medal, University of Wisconsin, Madison.
 1993: National Academy of Engineering, for "contributions to the field of digital control, protection, and monitoring of power electrical systems."
2000: IEEE Herman Halperin Award.
2000: IEEE Third Millennium Medal.
 2006: “Doctor Honoris Causa” awarded by the Institute National Polytechnic de Grenoble (INPG).
2006 IEEE Outstanding Power Engineering Educator Award.
 2007: Along with Stanley Horowitz, the Vladimir Karapetoff Award by Eta Kappa Nu, for "their technical contributions to the field of power system protection and control."
 2008: Along with James Thorp, head of the Bradley Department of Electrical Engineering at Virginia Tech, The Franklin Institute's 2008 Benjamin Franklin Medal in Electrical Engineering for their contributions to the power industry, particularly microprocessor controllers in electric power systems that have significantly decreased the occurrence and duration of power blackouts.
 2016: IEEE Medal in Power Engineering, for "contributions to synchrophasor technology for monitoring, control, and protection of electric power systems.”

Selected publications
 Textbook: Computer Relaying for Power Systems (Arun G. Phadke and J. S. Thorp (Research Studies Press))
Research monograph : Synchronized Phasor Measurements and Their Applications, (Arun G. Phadke and J.S. Thorp (Springer))
 Textbook:  Handbook of Electrical Engineering Calculations (ed. Arun G. Phadke (Marcel Dekker))
 Textbook: Power System Relaying (Arun G. Phadke and Stanley H. Horowitz (John Wiley & Sons))
Dr. Phadke with his students and colleagues have published more than 200 papers in various national and international journals.

References

External links
 Dr. Phadke's webpage 

Virginia Tech faculty
Living people
Members of the United States National Academy of Engineering
American academics of Indian descent
Year of birth missing (living people)